Dasht Rural District may refer to:
 Dasht Rural District (Meshgin Shahr County), Ardabil province
 Dasht Rural District (Isfahan Province)
 Dasht Rural District (Urmia County), West Azerbaijan province

See also
 Dasht-e Bil Rural District